Carleton Glacier is a glacier which drains the northwest slopes of Mount Lister in the Royal Society Range and flows north into the Emmanuel Glacier. It was mapped by the United States Geological Survey from ground surveys and from Navy air photos, and named by the Advisory Committee on Antarctic Names in 1963, in association with nearby Rutgers Glacier, after Carleton College, Northfield, Minnesota, which has sent researchers to Antarctica.

References
 

Glaciers of Victoria Land
Carleton College
Scott Coast